Pavel Složil and Tomáš Šmíd were the defending champions, but did not participate this year.

Stanislav Birner and Blaine Willenborg won the title, defeating Joakim Nyström and Mats Wilander 6–1, 2–6, 6–3 in the final.

Seeds

  Anders Järryd /  Hans Simonsson (first round)
  Joakim Nyström /  Mats Wilander (final)
  Tian Viljoen /  Danie Visser (semifinals)
  Stanislav Birner /  Blaine Willenborg (champions)

Draw

Draw

References
Draw

1983 in Swiss sport
1983 Grand Prix (tennis)
1983 Geneva Open